Baku Marionette Theatre established by the director and artist Tarlan Gorchu in the mid of 1980. 

The first performance of the theater was the marionette of Uzeyir Hajibeyli's opera Arshin Mal Alan. The premiere held in France in 1990. The French press wrote: "The Marionettes are capable of everything!", "Two more nights of joy!” Thus, by the wishes of the audience, additional performances of "Arshin mal alan" were held.

In 1993 the theatre changed its status to the municipal theatre, and in 2013 joined the “Icherisheher” Administration. More favorable conditions allowed the team to focus all its creative energy on the staging of Uzeyir Hajibeyli’s opera ‘Leyli & Majnun’. In 2016 the Theatre was able to perform on its permanent stage for the first time.

The façade of the historic building was designed in the late 19th century with classical Russian architectural elements and European décor. In the 1960s, a strong fire broke out in the building and it fell into a miserable state. Although the building was built in the 80s. Lately, the building was commissioned by the Marionette Theater, where the major reconstruction and renovation works held.

In 2013, Baku Marionette Theatre was included in Administration of State Historical-Architectural Reserve “Icherisheher” under the Cabinet of Ministers of the Republic of Azerbaijan. With the great support of First Lady and the First Vice President of Republic of Azerbaijan Mehriban Aliyeva, “Icherisheher” Department allocated funds for the restoration. Finally, the restoration and repair works ended up in 2016 and the team of Marionette Theatre settled down in their permanent address.

References 

Theatres in Baku
Marionette operas
Puppet theaters